The Night Buffalo (orig. Spanish El Búfalo de la Noche) is a novel by Guillermo Arriaga.

Plot summary
After Gregorio commits suicide, his friend Manuel finds himself unraveling his late friend’s world, and what led him to suicide.  Gregorio’s tortuous relationship with his girlfriend is now inherited by Manuel; he becomes involved with his late friend’s girlfriend.  Gregorio has missed appointments, left strange messages, and has been harassed by a vengeful policeman.

Release details
2005, UK, Sceptre Books, Pub date 27 March 2006, paperback (first English edition)
2006, ?, Atria Books, Pub date ? May 2006, hardback (English)
2007, USA, Washington Square Press, Pub date 20 February 2007, paperback (English)
2008, ?, Atria Books, Pub date ? March 2008, paperback (Spanish El Búfalo de la Noche edition)

1999 novels
Novels by Guillermo Arriaga
Fiction about suicide
Spanish-language novels